Edward W. Hinton (1868-1936) was the James Parker Hall Professor of Law at the University of Chicago Law School from 1931 to 1936. Hinton was a scholar of evidence and civil procedure and published an early casebook on pleading standards. Before becoming a law professor, Hinton practiced law in Missouri and lectured at the University of Missouri Law School.

The University of Chicago Law School's moot court competition is named after Professor Hinton.

Bibliography

Books 
 Cases on Code Pleading (1st ed. 1906); (2d ed. 1922); (3d ed. 1932).
 Cases on Trial Practice (1st ed. 1915); (2d ed. 1930).
 Cases on Evidence (1st ed. 1919); (2d ed. 1931).
 Cases on Common Law Pleading (1923) (Cook & Hinton).
 Cases on Equity Pleading (1927).
 Lectures on the Illinois Civil Practice Act (Stenographic Report 1933).

Articles 
 Some Problems in Hearsay and Relevancy in Missouri, iS Law Ser. Mo. B. 3-14 (June 1917).
 Equitable Defenses under Modern Codes, 18 Mich. L. Rev. 717-35 (June I920).
 Substituted Service on Non-Residents, 59 Am. L. Rev. 592–601, 20 Inl. L. Rev. z-8 (May 1925).
 An American Experiment with the English Rules of Court, 20 Iil. L. Rev. 533-45 (February 1926).
 Court Rules for the Regulation of Procedure in the Federal Courts, 13 A.B.A. J. 8 (pt. II, March 1927).
 Arbitration by Jury, 6 Wash. L. Rev. 155-65 (November 1931).
 States of Mind and the Hearsay Rule, i Univ. Chi. L. Rev. 394-423 (January 1934).
 Pleading under the Illinois Civil Practice Act, i Univ. Chi. L. Rev. 580-92 (March 1934).
 Changes in the Exceptions to the Hearsay Rule, 29 Ill. L. Rev. 422-47 (December 1934)

Notes

1868 births
1936 deaths